Jack Neo (born 24 January 1960) is a Singaporean actor, television host, comedian and film director. He was prominently a full-time Mediacorp artiste from 1983 to 2003. In the 1990s and early 2000s, he was best known for his cross-dressing roles, as Liang Po Po (literally: Granny Liang) and Liang Xi Mei (a woman homemaker in her 40s) in the long-running television comedy show Comedy Nite.

Since his debut as a feature director, Neo has proven to be the most commercially successful local director who has also met with some success in Malaysia and Taiwan. He has shown a penchant for the franchise series films. His most critically acclaimed film is I Not Stupid, which satirizes Singapore's streaming educational system in 2002. Despite his box office success, many of his recent films have been panned by local critics as being simplistic, sexist, and having too many blatant product placement.

Career
Neo wrote and acted in a comedy skit for Tanjong Katong Secondary School at the age of 14.

Neo started his career on television in 1980 and became one of the most successful and recognisable celebrities in SBC for his comedic roles on both film and television. His two most notable cross-dressing roles on film and television are Liang Po Po and Liang Xi Mei, both skits in the long-running comedy variety show Comedy Nite. Neo made his directorial debut in That One Not Enough (1999) and he set up his own artiste management company, J Team Productions, whose members include comedians Mark Lee, Henry Thia and John Cheng.

Neo's films satirise several aspects about Singapore in comical ways, including societal issues such as negligent parenting and school corporal punishment, and foreign issues such as the water disputes between Singapore and Malaysia. Apart from his film and TV career, Neo has also recorded and produced a number of albums.

Neo received the Best Director Award at the Silver Screen Awards in 1998 for his short film and was also awarded with the Lifetime Achievement Award in the following year in recognition of his contributions to Singapore's media industry. Since then, he became a filmmaker and created his first film, Money No Enough, directed by Tay Teck Lock and released into cinemas on 7 May 1998. In 2004, Neo became the first filmmaker in Singapore to be honoured with the Public Service Medal. He also received the Cultural Medallion on 21 October 2005 together with musician Dick Lee.

In 2008, Neo and Mark Lee bought the Singapore master franchise rights for Old Town White Coffee, a coffee retail concept from Ipoh, Malaysia. Their first store at Big Splash opened on 30 March in that year.

In 2013, Neo announced the creation of J Team Academy, an educational institute which aimed to bring together industry experts to groom new film-making talent. The academy opened on 6 April 2013. In September, Neo won the Best Actor award for his role in Homecoming (2011) at the 1st Golden Wau Awards, aimed at promoting Chinese-language Malaysian films.

In October 2014, the Madame Tussauds Singapore museum unveiled a wax figure of Neo.

2015 saw the release of Neo's short film as part of the omnibus 7 Letters to commemorate Singapore's 50th year of independence. Malaysian censors took offence with Neo's segment when it was submitted to them for a screening at Kuala Lumpur's Titian Budaya Festival. They initially requested a cut to the vulgar phrase in Cantonese, “curse your whole family”, but a successful appeal was made by organisers, CultureLink.

Neo released the first two parts of his planned four-part film on the transition from village life to government housing in the first quarter of 2016, Long Long Time Ago and Long Long Time Ago 2.

Personal life 
Neo married Irene Kng in 1990 and have three sons and a daughter.

In March 2010, a two-year-long extramarital affair between Neo and freelance model Wendy Chong was publicised and Neo admitted to the affair. Chong, who played a minor role in Neo's 2008 film Money No Enough 2, claimed that Neo initiated the affair. Neo later attempted to end the affair but Chong threatened to hurt herself and the exposé caused much debate and discussion amongst the entertainment circle of Singapore.

On 9 March 2010, additional reports were released about Neo having or attempting extramarital affairs with up to 11 women. He tried to ask actress-host Foyce Le Xuan & French student Maelle Meurzec for sexual favours when she was working for him. Foyce, who went to the same church as Neo, claimed that she was advised by her City Harvest Church pastor to cease talking to the media, as Neo's pastor was trying to counsel him and his wife after his affair became public. On 11 March, Neo and Kng held a five-minute press conference, in which Neo admitted his mistake and asked the media to let him off. After that, Kng reiterated her love for Neo and also requested for the media to spare her.

Subsequently, his endorsement deal with Mitsubishi Electric Asia was dropped and TV advertisements featuring the director were taken off air. Other advertisers, such as Bee Cheng Hiang and Goh Joo Hin, initially adopted a "wait-and-see" attitude, but otherwise similarly dropped all endorsement deals.

Filmography

Television

Variety shows

Discography

Drama soundtracks

Awards and nominations

References

External links

J Team Productions
Jack Neo's Blog

Living people
1960 births
Converts to Christianity from Buddhism
People of Hokkien descent
Singaporean people of Hokkien descent
Singaporean Charismatics
Singaporean television personalities
Singaporean male film actors
Singaporean film directors
Recipients of the Cultural Medallion
20th-century Singaporean male actors
21st-century Singaporean male actors